Ruffec is a commune in the Charente department in southwestern France.

It is a stopover town on the road from Paris to Spain (Route nationale 10), between Poitiers and Angoulême.

During the Second World War, Ruffec was at the centre of Resistance for the evacuation of the Allied airmen towards Spain.

Population
Its inhabitants are known as the Ruffécois or the Ruffécoises in French.

Twin towns – sister cities
Ruffec is twinned with:

  Waldsee, Germany 
  Pásztó, Hungary

See also
Communes of the Charente department

References

Communes of Charente
Angoumois